Wadala Kalan  is a village in Kapurthala district of Punjab State, India. The village is administrated by a Sarpanch who is an elected representative of village as per the constitution of India and Panchayati raj (India).

Demography 
According to the report published by Census India in 2011, Wadala Kalan has 352 houses with the total population of 1,639 persons of which 822 are male and 817 females. Literacy rate of  Wadala Kalan is 81.05%, higher than the state average of 75.84%.  The population of children in the age group 0–6 years is 140 which is  8.54% of the total population.  Child sex ratio is approximately 867, higher than the state average of 846.

Population data

References

External links
  Villages in Kapurthala
 Kapurthala Villages List

Villages in Kapurthala district